Forthing (Dongfeng Fengxing) is an automobile marque owned by the Chinese automaker Dongfeng Liuzhou Motor, a division of Dongfeng Motor Group. The brand was launched in 2001 using the Fengxing (风行) name, and was later renamed to Forthing as the English name, while the Chinese name remained the same. The Forthing or Fengxing brand is the first Chinese brand to produce MPVs for family use.

Starting from the brand launch, the Forthing or Fengxing brand products had always worn the Dongfeng logo, just like the majority of vehicle brands under the Dongfeng umbrella. On November 17 2020, the Forthing T5 EVO crossover was launched and at the press conference, Dongfeng Fengxing’s new Lion Logo was unveiled with the Forthing T5 EVO to be the first product to wear the updated badge. On June 10, 2021, the brand renewal conference of Dongfeng Fengxing was held in Shanghai, and Dongfeng Fengxing's first concept car dedicated to family mobility was unveiled alongside the official announcement of the new logo. The update is the brand-new logo of "Confidence, Fearlessness, and Bravery Forward" in the form of the Lion logo.

Products of the Forthing brand include the Jingyi crossover SUV series also known as Joyear for oversea markets, the Jingyi S50 sedan and the S500 large multi-purpose vehicle, as well as two types of vans, the Lingzhi and the CM7. Some of these models are also sold in Latin American markets such as Chile and Peru under the brands Dongfeng, DFM or DFLZ.

Products
The following vehicles are currently available.

Forthing T5/ Forthing T5L compact crossover 
Forthing T5 EVO compact crossover 
Forthing SX6 mid-size crossover/ Fengxing SX6 EV electric mid-size crossover
Forthing S500 compact MPV/ Fengxing S500 EV electric compact MPV
Forthing F600 MPV
Forthing CM7 MPV
Forthing Yacht MPV
Lingzhi series vans:
Forthing Lingzhi V3 panel van
Forthing Lingzhi M3 MPV
Forthing Lingzhi M5 MPV/ M5 EV electric MPV
Joyear (Jingyi) series:
Forthing Jingyi S50 compact sedan/ Jingyi S50 EV electric compact sedan
Forthing Jingyi X3 subcompact crossover
Forthing Jingyi X5 compact crossover
Forthing Jingyi X6 mid-size crossover

Product Gallery

References

External links
 

Car manufacturers of China
Dongfeng Motor divisions and subsidiaries
Companies based in Liuzhou
Dongfeng Motor
Car brands